Prince Albert is a community in the Canadian province of Nova Scotia, located on North Mountain in Annapolis County. It is probably named after Albert, Prince Consort of Queen Victoria.

References

Communities in Annapolis County, Nova Scotia